Cristoforo Rosa  (?? in Brescia – 1576 in Brescia) was an Italian painter of quadratura (illusionistic ceiling painting) of the Renaissance period.

In 1569, with his brother Stefano, Rosa painted the entry ceilings for the Library of St. Mark's in Venice. He died during the plague in Brescia.

Rosa's son, Pietro, became a pupil of Titian.

References

1569 deaths
16th-century Italian painters
Italian male painters
Italian Renaissance painters
Quadratura painters
Painters from Brescia
Year of birth unknown